Peter M. Monti is an American psychologist, currently the Donald G. Millar Distinguished Professor of Alcohol and Addiction Studies, Professor of Behavioral and Social Sciences and Director of Alcohol and Addiction Studies at Brown University. He is a Fellow of the American Psychological Society.

Monti holds degrees from Providence College, the College of William & Mary, and the University of Rhode Island.

References

Year of birth missing (living people)
Living people
Brown University faculty
21st-century American psychologists
Providence College alumni
University of Rhode Island alumni
College of William & Mary alumni